Greenville, Oregon may refer to:

Greenville, Linn County, Oregon, a populated place
Greenville, Washington County, Oregon, a historic locale